Titumate is a settlement in Unguía Municipality, Chocó Department in Colombia.

Climate
Titumate has a tropical rainforest climate (Af) with heavy to very heavy rainfall year-round.

References

Populated places in the Chocó Department